Ian Monks (6 August 1931 – 6 January 2009) was an Australian rules footballer who played with Essendon and South Melbourne in the Victorian Football League (VFL). He won a reserves premiership with Essendon in 1952. After his time in the VFL, he played for Port Melbourne and Caulfield in the Victorian Football Association (VFA).

Monks also played district cricket for Essendon.

See also
 The 1965-66 Victorian District Cricket final

Notes

External links 
		

Essendon Football Club past player profile

1931 births
2009 deaths
Australian rules footballers from Victoria (Australia)
Essendon Football Club players
Sydney Swans players
Cricketers from Victoria (Australia)
Port Melbourne Football Club players
Caulfield Football Club players